Martin Zounar (born 26 May 1967) is a Czech actor and TV personality. He first gained national fame as the young soldier Tomáš in the TV series Chlapci a chlapi. Some of his other roles include the films, Pták Ohnivák, Vesklák and a number of TV shows such as Přístav, Velmi křehké vztahy, Rodinná pouta and Ordinace v růžové zahradě 2. Martin Zounar is the son of accomplished Czech actor .

References

1967 births
Living people
Czech television personalities
Czech male television actors
Czech male film actors
Actors from Hradec Králové